Repetobasidiaceae is a phylogenetically defined family encompassing resupinate, poroid, stereoid, clavarioid, and agaricoid fungi, among other forms. Currently no description of the emended family circumscription is available.

References

 
Basidiomycota families
Taxa named by Walter Jülich
Fungi described in 1982